Zeballos Cué is a neighbourhood (barrio) of Asunción, Paraguay.

Geography 

Límits

Paraguay River to the north.

Loma Pytá neighbourhood to the south.

Mariano Roque Alonso City to the east.

Bótanico neighbourhood to the west

Neighbourhoods of Asunción